The 2017–18 East Tennessee State Buccaneers women's basketball team represented East Tennessee State University (ETSU) during the 2017–18 NCAA Division I women's basketball season. The "Bucs", led by fifth-year head coach Brittney Ezell, played their home games at the Freedom Hall Civic Center as members of the Southern Conference (SoCon). The Bucs finished the season 20–13, 11–3 in second place in the SoCon, losing to Mercer in the conference tournament. They received a berth in the 2018 WNIT but lost in the first round to the James Madison Dukes.

Previous season
The Bucs ended the 2016–17 season at 16–14, 8–6 in SoCon play to finish in third place. They lost in the quarterfinals of the SoCon women's tournament to Samford.

Roster

Schedule

|-
!colspan=9 style="background:#041E42; color:#FFC72C;"| Regular Season
|-

|-
!colspan=9 style="background:#041E42; color:#FFC72C;"| SoCon Regular Season
|-

|-
!colspan=9 style="background:#041E42; color:#FFC72C;"| SoCon Tournament

|-
!colspan=9 style="background:#041E42; color:#FFC72C;"| WNIT

Source:

References

East Tennessee State Buccaneers women's basketball seasons
East Tennessee
East Tennessee
East Tennessee
East Tennessee